The Australian Alps National Parks and Reserves is a group of eleven protected areas consisting of  national parks, nature reserves and one wilderness park located in the Australian Capital Territory, New South Wales and Victoria and which was listed as a "place"  on the Australian National Heritage List on 7 November 2008 under the Environment Protection and Biodiversity Conservation Act 1999. The listing includes the following protected areas - Alpine, Baw Baw, Brindabella, Kosciuszko, Mount Buffalo, Namadgi and Snowy River national parks; the Avon Wilderness Park, and the Bimberi, Scabby Range and Tidbinbilla nature reserves.

Gallery

See also

 Australian Alps
 List of Australian Capital Territory protected areas
 Protected areas of New South Wales
 Protected areas of Victoria

References

External links

 
 

 
Australian National Heritage List
Protected areas established in 2008
2008 establishments in Australia
Snowy Mountains
Alpine National Park
Brindabella Ranges
National parks of New South Wales
Protected areas of the Australian Capital Territory
Protected areas of New South Wales
Protected areas of Victoria (Australia)